Marichromatium is a genus in the phylum Pseudomonadota (Bacteria). The name Marichromatium derives from: Latin mare, the sea; New Latin Chromatium, a genus name;  to give Marichromatium, the Chromatium of the sea, the truly marine Chromatium.

Species
The genus contains five species (including basonyms and synonyms), namely:
 M. bheemlicum (Anil Kumar et al. 2007, New Latin bheemlicum, pertaining to Bheemli, the place from which the type strain was isolated)
 M. fluminis (Sucharita et al. 2010, Latin n fluminis, of a river, referring to the isolation of the type strain from sediment of the Baitarani River, located in Kalibanj Forest, Orissa, India)
 M. gracile (Strzeszewski 1913) Imhoff et al. 1998, (type species of the genus), Latin gracile, thin, slender)
 M. indicum (Arunasri et al. 2005, Latin indicum, Indian, pertaining to India, the country in which the type strain was isolated)
 M. purpuratum (Imhoff and Trüper 1980, Imhoff et al. 1998, Latin purpuratum, clad or dressed in purple)

See also
 Bacterial taxonomy 
 Microbiology

References 

Chromatiales
Bacteria genera